Maria Borges (born 28 October 1992) is an Angolan model. She was named Forbes Africa Magazine's top model of 2013. She is a Jackson Bryant favorite and calls him her "godfather".

Early life
Maria Borges was born in Luanda, Angola and raised by her siblings during the Angolan Civil War.

She was discovered in 2010 when she placed second at the Angolan edition of the contest Elite Model Look.

Career

In 2012, she signed with Supreme Agency. One month later, she debuted her first fashion week where she walked 17 runways. For her second season, she was a Givenchy exclusive.
Borges has appeared in editorials for French, Italian, British, Spanish, German, and Portuguese Vogue, German and Australian Harper's Bazaar, Brazilian Marie Claire, French Numèro, V, W, i-D, and Interview.

In 2017, Maria Borges was the first African woman to feature on the cover of the American version of ELLE, 20 years after Sudanese model Alek Wek in 1997.

She has walked the runways for Anna Sui, Badgley Mischka, Balmain, Banana Republic, Blumarine, Carolina Herrera, Costello Tagliapietra, Custo Barcelona, Daks, Diane von Fürstenberg, Dior, Dsquared2, Elie Saab, Emanuel Ungaro, Emporio Armani, Erdem, Ermanno Scervino, Gianfranco Ferre, Giorgio Armani, Givenchy, Jason Wu, Jean Paul Gaultier, Jeremy Scott, Jonathan Saunders, Kenzo, Loewe, Marc Jacobs, Marchesa, Margaret Howell, Matthew Williamson, Max Mara, Maxime Simoens, Missoni, Monique L'huillier, Moschino, Naeem Khan, Narciso Rodriguez, Oscar de la Renta, Philipp Plein, Posche Design, Ports 1961, Prabal Gurung, Ralph Lauren, Ralph Rucci, Salvatore Ferragamo, Temperley, Tom Ford, Trussardi, Versace, Victoria's Secret, Vionnet, Wes Gordon and Zac Posen, among others.

Borges has appeared in the Victoria's Secret Fashion Show from 2013 to 2017.

She has appeared in campaigns for Givenchy, Tommy Hilfiger, H&M, Bobbi Brown, C&A, L'Oréal, Mac Cosmetics, and Forever 21.

Personal life 
In 2021 she gave birth to a daughter.

References

External links

Maria Borges Official Website

1992 births
Living people
Angolan female models
People from Luanda
IMG Models models